The moon striped mouse or Ruwenzori hybomys (Hybomys lunaris) is a species of rodent in the family Muridae.
It is found in Democratic Republic of the Congo, Rwanda, and Uganda.
Its natural habitat is subtropical or tropical moist montane forests.
It is threatened by habitat loss.

Description 
The moon striped mouse ranges from 10 to 16 centimeters (4-6.4 inches) in body length, with a tail length of 7–13.5 centimeters (2.8-5.4 inches). It weighs 30-70 grams (1-2.5 ounces).

Diet 
The moon striped mouse feeds on a wide array of food, including insects, fruits, and seeds.

Reproduction 
The moon striped mouse has a gestation period of 28–29 days, and gives birth to 2-3 young.

References

 Van der Straeten, E. & Kerbis Peterhans, J. 2004.  Hybomys lunaris.   2006 IUCN Red List of Threatened Species.   Downloaded on 19 July 2007.

Hybomys
Rodents of Africa
Mammals described in 1906
Taxa named by Oldfield Thomas
Taxonomy articles created by Polbot